The 1972–73 international cricket season was from September 1972 to April 1973.

Season overview

December

England in India

Pakistan in Australia

February

Pakistan in New Zealand

Australia in the West Indies

March

England in Pakistan

References

International cricket competitions by season
1972 in cricket
1973 in cricket